1962: The War in the Hills is an Indian Hindi-language war drama streaming-television series for Disney+ Hotstar, written and directed by Mahesh Manjrekar. Inspired by the 1962 Sino-Indian war, the series features Abhay Deol, Sumeet Vyas, Rohan Gandotra, Mahie Gill and Akash Thosar in leading roles. The series showcases a fictional account of real battles fought in Galwan Valley and Rezang La where 125 Ahir soldiers of the Indian Army were tasked with defending against a 3000 strong People's Liberation Army

The series released on 26 February 2021 on Disney+ Hotstar and received mostly mixed reviews from critics, who criticized its long run time and visual effects.

Plot 
The official synopsis reads,

Cast 

 Abhay Deol as Major Suraj Singh, a character inspired by Major Shaitan Singh
 Sumeet Vyas as Officer Ram Kumar
 Akash Thosar as Sepoy Kishan Yadav
 Mahie Gill as Ms. Shagun Singh, wife of Suraj Singh, inspired by Shaitan Singh's wife Ms. Shagun Kanwar
 Arif Zakaria as Pt. Jawaharlal Nehru
 Geetika Vidya Ohlyan as Indira Gandhi
 Kishore Nandlaskar as Dak Chacha
 Hemal Ingle as Radha
Pooja Sawant as Padma
 Rohan Gandotra as Sepoy Karan Yadav
Vineet Sharma as Subhedar Hardam Singh Yadav
Jay Parab as Sepoy Nakul
Satya Manjrekar as Sepoy Gopal Yadav
Sanjay Dadich as Mohan Yadav
Prem Dharmadhikari (child) as Raju Yadav
 Meiyang Chang as Major Lin
 Bijou Thaangjam as a Chinese soldier
 Liao Meng Chi as Ug Lee
 Pawandeep Rajan as Nodo Tana
 Divyansh Mishra as a young boy
 Anup Soni as Major Khattar
 Karim Hajee as General Singha
 Rochelle Rao as Rimpa
 Jaideep Singh Sehmbi as Sepoy Vishal Sardar
 Diganta Hazarika as Pema
 Pallavi Kulkarni as Jaya
 Sammaera Jaiswal as Neelam (Daughter of Major Suraj Singh and Mrs. Shagun Singh)
 Pawandeep Rajan as Radar
 Medha Manjrekar as Radha's Mom
 Shiv Subramaniam as Mr. Krishna
 Shivramprasad Pandit as Masterji

Episodes

Production

Development 
In July 2019, Hotstar had announced its collaboration with Arre Studios to produce a new series showcasing the life of soldiers, based on the backdrop of the Sino-Indian war happened in 1962 and roped in Mahesh Manjrekar to direct the series. A source from the online portal Peeping Moon stated that Abhay Deol will act in the series as Major Shaitan Singh who was the frontrunner of the Indian Army during that period. The team kickstarted the casting process in the very same month which was ended in August 2019. It was touted to be one of the most costliest Hotstar original productions. The series producer Ajay Chacko stated that "We haven’t treated the series as an OTT show but three feature films rolled into one. It took us about two-and-half years from the inception to finish. It’s not an ordinary show, but one with many firsts."

Casting 
The project came into news in mid-November 2019 with Abhay Deol being confirmed as the lead actor in the series. Sumeet Vyas and Akash Thosar were also confirmed to play the pivotal characters in the series. Thosar stated that he eventually wanted to join the Indian Army since he was passionate in the profession during his childhood, but as it failed to happen, he eventually became an actor. Thosar stated that he was about to play a fictional soldier which he stated it as his "dream come true moment". He further stated that he had to gain 10 kilos for his role and also performed stunts for the first time. Vyas also stated that the biggest challenge in the series is doing stunt sequences, since he was initially a part of comedy and romantic genre series. In February 2021, Mahie Gill was announced to pair opposite Abhay Deol as Shagun Singh's wife. This marked their reunion of Deol and Gill after the 2009 film Dev.D.

Filming 
Shooting of the series began in September 2019. As the series requried stunts and action sequences, the production team roped in Don Lee, an internationally acclaimed stunt choreographer who is known for films such as Pirates of the Caribbean and Star Trek for the stunts. Most of the series were shot in Ladakh and Panchgani. Actor Rohan Gandotra about the shooting in Ladakh eventually stated that it was a surreal experience and he also had developed health issues citing shoot in high altitude. He stated that " Shooting in high terrain can be a challenge, especially with harsh weather conditions. But we trained really well and once we got to the shoot, everything made sense. It made me wonder — if we find it so tough to shoot for a few days, imagine what our soldiers go through on a daily basis." By December 2019, the makers had wrapped the shoot and entered post-production which has been completed few days before the COVID-19 pandemic lockdown in March 2020 was announced.

Soundtrack 

The soundtrack and score is composed by Hitesh Modak and lyrics for the soundtrack album were penned by Lavraj. The music video for the first song "Hum Shaan Se Jalne Nikle Hai" was released first on 5 February 2021. The entire soundtrack featuring 11 songs have been released on 19 February 2021. The album features vocals by Hitesh Modak, Vijay Prakash, Salman Ali, Sukhwinder Singh, Farhad Bhiwandiwala, Aanandi Joshi, Shailey Bidwaikar, Shamika Bhide, Susmirata Dawalkar, Maanuni Desai and Sanket Naik.

Release 
Originally planned for a 2021 release, the series was advanced for a November 2020 release as the 13th edition of the Indian Premier League will end on this month. It is mostly due to the anti-Chinese sentiment prevailing in India after the Galwan Valley disputes happened in June 2020. However the slated release did not happen due to certain reasons. On 26 January 2021, coinciding with Republic Day, the first look of the series was released through social media platforms which featured references to the 2020 Galwan Valley clash. The official trailer of the series was released on YouTube on 12 February 2021. The series premiered through Disney+ Hotstar on 26 February 2021.

Reception 
Saibal Chatterjee of NDTV gave two-and-a-half out of five stars and stated "The depiction of the titular war just about passes muster. The women who embody the tragic consequences of military conflict steal the show and nudge it into an unusual orbit, making 1962: The War In The Hills far more watchable than it would otherwise have been." Kirti Tulsiani of Zoom TV gave two-and-a-half out of five stars and stated "The show, in that regard, is a must-watch as it humanises soldiers in the day and age where people often end up using their stories as tokens of patriotism on social media. However, there are flaws too. If you are ready to overlook the dramatisation of many moments and also expect some creative liberties, then 1962: The War in the Hills is a show you can watch."

Ektaa Malik of The Indian Express gave one-out of five stars saying "the show pretends to be a period piece, but fails miserably". Rohan Naahar writing for Hindustan Times panned the series describing "Shrill, tacky, and jaw-droppingly amateurish, Abhay Deol's Hotstar war drama is the worst show on a mainstream Indian platform." Jyoti Kanyal of India Today wrote "1962: The War On The Hills is a highly disappointing war drama. The plot is not engaging, you cannot empathise with any of the characters, and to top it all, there's no adherence to any logic."

References

External links

2020s Indian television miniseries
2021 Indian television series debuts
Indian military television series
War television series
Television series set in 1962
Television shows set in Jammu and Kashmir
Sino-Indian War films
Films directed by Mahesh Manjrekar